Albert Onyembo Lomandjo (July 6, 1931 – January 11, 2016) was a Roman Catholic bishop.

Ordained to the priesthood in 1958, Onyembo Lomandjo was appointed bishop of the Roman Catholic Diocese of Kindu, Democratic Republic of the Congo in 1966 resigning in 1978.

Notes

1931 births
2016 deaths
20th-century Roman Catholic bishops in the Democratic Republic of the Congo
Roman Catholic bishops of Kindu
21st-century Democratic Republic of the Congo people